Pseudochromis marshallensis, the Marshall Island dottyback, is a species of ray-finned fish from the  Pacific Ocean, which is a member of the family Pseudochromidae.

References

marshallensis
Taxa named by Leonard Peter Schultz
Fish described in 1953